Green View Lake is located in North Cascades National Park, in the U. S. state of Washington.

References

Lakes of Washington (state)
North Cascades National Park
Lakes of Chelan County, Washington